The 1892 Wisconsin gubernatorial election was held on November 8, 1892.

Incumbent Democratic Governor George Wilbur Peck defeated Republican nominee John Coit Spooner.

General election

Candidates
Major party candidates
George Wilbur Peck, Democratic, incumbent Governor
John Coit Spooner, Republican, former U.S. Senator

Other candidates
Thomas C. Richmond, Prohibition, Prohibition nominee for Wisconsin's 3rd congressional district in 1888
Cyrus M. Butt, Populist, former Republican State Senator

Results

References

1892
Wisconsin
Gubernatorial